Hezlett House is a 17th-century thatched cottage located in Castlerock, County Londonderry. Built around 1691, it is one of the oldest buildings still in use anywhere in Ulster. The cottage has a cruck structure and is situated at the crossroads near the village. It was originally a rectory or farmhouse.

See also 
 Downhill Estate

References 

Inline

Other

 
 
 

National Trust properties in Northern Ireland
Buildings and structures in County Londonderry
Tourist attractions in County Londonderry
Grade A listed buildings
Historic house museums in Northern Ireland